The 88th District of the Iowa House of Representatives in the state of Iowa.

Current elected officials
David Kerr is the representative currently representing the district.

Past representatives
The district has previously been represented by:
 Keith Dunton, 1971–1973
 Keith H. Dunton, 1973–1979
 George R. Swearingen, 1979–1983
 Gene Blanshan, 1983–1993
 Horace Daggett, 1993–1997
 Cecil Dolecheck, 1997–2003
 Dennis Cohoon, 2003–2013
 Tom Sands, 2013–2017
 David Kerr, 2017–present

References

088